Courtney Miller may refer to:
Courtney Miller, American neurobiologist, recipient of the 2013 Presidential Early Career Award for Scientists and Engineers
Courtney Miller, Australian association football defender who played during the 2008–09 Newcastle Jets W-League season
Courtney Miller, Australian actress who played Bella Nixon in the soap opera Home and Away
Courtney Miller, American gridiron football cornerback who played during the 2001 Oregon Ducks football team season
Courtney Miller, American comedian and YouTuber who is a member of the YouTube channel Smosh